Hunter Brown may refer to:
 Hunter Brown (book series)
 Hunter Brown (baseball)
 Hunter Brown, musician with Sound Tribe Sector 9